Piara may refer to:

Given name
Piara Singh Bhaniara (1958–2019)
Piara Singh Gill (1911–2002), Indian nuclear physicist
Piara Khabra (1921–2007), British politician
Ram Piara Saraf (1924–2009), Indian politician
Choudhary Piara Singh, Indian politician

Other uses
, a genus of fly in subfamily Trapherinae